Ghost Ship is a 2002 American supernatural horror film directed by Steve Beck, and starring an ensemble cast featuring Gabriel Byrne, Julianna Margulies, Ron Eldard, Desmond Harrington, Isaiah Washington and Karl Urban. The film follows a marine salvage crew in the Bering Sea who discover a mysterious ocean liner that disappeared in 1962. Despite its title, the film is unrelated to the 1952 film of the same name.

The film was shot in Queensland, Australia, and Vancouver, British Columbia, Canada, and released theatrically in North America on October 25, 2002. It received largely negative reviews from critics but was a commercial success grossing over $68 million worldwide.

Plot
In 1962, aboard the Italian ocean liner MS Antonia Graza, passengers dance to the song "Senza Fine" sung by Francesca. A young girl, Katie, sits alone until the ship's captain offers to dance with her. A hand lifts a lever that tightens a wire cord. The wire whips across the dance floor, bisecting the passengers and crew. Katie is spared as the wire rips above her head through the captain, who is killed. 

Forty years later, a salvage crew — Captain Sean Murphy, Maureen Epps, Greer, Dodge, Munder and Santos — are approached by Jack Ferriman, a weather service pilot who spotted a vessel adrift in the Bering Sea. It can be claimed by whoever brings it to port. The crew sets out on their salvage tug, the Arctic Warrior. The ship is the Antonia Graza, missing since 1962. Boarding the abandoned liner, the salvagers discover nine boxes, each containing twenty-eight 100-oz gold bars.

After a series of supernatural events, the group decides to leave with the gold, but an invisible force sabotages the Arctic Warrior with a propane gas leak. The tugboat explodes, killing Santos.

With no other option, the group repairs the Graza. Greer encounters the apparition of Francesca, who seduces him into cheating on his fiancée, then leads him to fall down an elevator shaft. Murphy enters the captain's cabin and encounters the ghost of the captain. The captain explains that they recovered the gold from a sinking cruise ship, the Lorelei, along with a sole survivor. Murphy is shown a picture of the survivor, whom he recognizes. He rushes to tell the others but hallucinates and sees everyone as the ghost of the burned Santos, who provokes him into a rage. The others think Murphy has gone mad and lock him in the drained fish tank, Epps later finds him drowned; an invisible force has opened a valve filling the tank with water.

Epps meets Katie's ghost, who reveals what happened on the Graza. The sole survivor of the Lorelei convinced many of the Graza'''s crew to murder their passengers, as well as the captain and officers, for the gold. After murdering the passengers, the crew turned on each other. Francesca killed the officer who survived. The mastermind behind the massacre killed Francesca by releasing a hook that slashed her neck. He then branded her palm with a hook-shaped symbol using only his hands. The man is Jack Ferriman, the demonic spirit of a deceased sinner tasked with provoking people to sin, then killing them and bringing their souls to Hell. Epps deduces that Ferriman lured the salvage team to the Graza to repair it and decides to sink it to thwart his plan. Munder is crushed to death under the ship's gears while scuba diving in the flooded engine room. Epps tells Dodge to keep Jack on the ship's bridge while she sets explosives. Ferriman taunts Dodge, mocking him as a coward for never acting on his feelings for Epps, then charges him. Dodge shoots Ferriman with a shotgun and believes Ferriman to be dead.

Epps is setting explosives when she is confronted by Dodge. He tells her he killed Ferriman and that they can salvage the gold to start a life together, but Epps asks why Dodge has not asked where Munder is. Dodge morphs into Ferriman, who killed Dodge. Ferriman plans to use the Graza as a trap to continue collecting souls. As long as the Graza is kept afloat, the souls of everyone who died aboard the ship will be dragged down when Ferriman returns to Hell. Epps detonates the explosives. Ferriman is blown to pieces in the explosion, while Katie helps Epps escape the sinking ship. Katie and the other trapped souls ascend to Heaven.

Epps is found by a cruise ship and returned to land. As she is loaded into an ambulance, she sees the gold being loaded onto the cruise ship by people who resemble her fellow Arctic Warrior crew, overseen by a resurrected Ferriman, who glares at her and carries on. Epps screams loudly as the ambulance doors close.

Cast 

Production
WritingGhost Ship first emerged in January 1996 as Chimera, a spec script by Mark Hanlon. This script was a relatively bloodless psychological thriller rather than a vivid supernatural horror film. Most notably, much of the film's gore is absent from the screenplay. The film would have focused on four members of a salvage crew who end up stranded aboard the ghost vessel they are scuttling (the titular Chimera). Over the course of one night, each member — due to panic, cabin fever, or supernatural forces — goes insane and plots to kill the other three.

In Chimera, Murphy is the "main killer" and the ship runs onto some rocks and begins to sink. Murphy and Epps survive until nearly the end but as the ship sinks, Murphy goes off to retrieve gold ingots. The weight of the gold and the time he loses in getting to it leads to Murphy's demise. As in the film, Katie helps Epps escape. Over time, the script underwent rewrites, and the psychological aspects of the script were all jettisoned in favor of making the film a slasher. It has been suggested that "The cast signed on based on this (original) draft ... and were sadly disappointed to find the script had been radically changed by Joel Silver and associates when they arrived to begin shooting." According to Beck in the newly released directors commentary he mentioned that the September 11 attacks in the United States inspired the studio to make the film a more definitive fight between good and evil instead of trying to be nuanced about the corruption of man.

Scale modeling
The idea of filming on a real ship was continually brought up, and a few ships were scouted for the possibility of being used as the Antonia Graza. "The temptation was always to shoot on the real thing," Beck says. "We actually visited a few [ships] , but every time we thought, 'How are we ever going to get a dolly through this alley? Or down this hallway?' When you're shooting you often have to punch through a wall in order to get the shot you need, and on a steel ship that's impossible. We knew the real thing would be far too limiting."

Instead of using an actual ship, Australian visual effects company Photon VFX, who prior had worked on the 2002 film Scooby-Doo, was hired as the principal contractor for all visual effects. This allowed Warner Bros. to take full advantage of the wide spectrum of services offered including CGI, animation, miniatures, live-action, prosthetics, pyrotechnics and aerial, underwater and motion control cinematography.

The SS Andrea Doria served as the inspiration for the film's ship the Antonia Graza. Photon created a 35-foot 1/20th scale model of the ship, allowing the exterior shots to be a combination of CGI, miniature, and live-action footage. For certain exterior shots a miniature just wouldn't work, so instead a full-scale forecastle and bow were constructed. "It was a full-scale replica, so it wouldn't have fit into a studio," Walker explains. "It also needed to have sky backgrounds surrounding it, so we built it on a hill to achieve the desired effect."

Filming
Principal photography for Ghost Ship began in January 2002 on location in Queensland, Australia.

The majority of the film was shot on sets built on a sound stage at Village Roadshow Studios. The only ship used in Ghost Ship was the tugboat Arctic Warrior used by the main protagonists. While filming the exterior shots on the tugboat, a feeding frenzy occurred in the water bringing 800-1000 sharks within 50 yards of the production and its stars.

In February 2002, the 35-foot-long model of the Antonia Graza, made by Photon VFX, was taken out to Moreton Bay to film establishing shots of the ship adrift. In early February, construction of the bow and foredeck of the full-scale replica of the Antonia Graza was getting underway at Newstead, Queensland. Construction, which lasted roughly six weeks, drew many curious residents and tourists that were hoping to get a look at the nearly 100-foot-tall (30m) massive hull that dominated the surrounding area.

The film was also shot in Halifax, Nova Scotia and Vancouver.

Effects
Dale Duguid, the creative director of Photon VFX, wanted to push the boundaries. There was a lot of pride for Ghost Ship since it was the largest visual effect contract completely done in Australia to date. Photon VFX filmed a real ocean-liner at sea off the coast of New South Wales, digitally removed the ship, but kept all of its movements, leaving nothing but ocean and sky. Then the tracking data was taken and in-put into a robotic filming system, which then filmed the 35-foot-long (10 m) miniature ship. The digital effects team then added 300 digital extras, in addition to digital water and smoke to make the scene appear as realistic as possible.

The dramatic scene, which features the derelict ballroom reverting to its former grand self, posed a problem for the effects crew. "That was the most difficult shot I've ever worked on," says Duguid. Filming took place on two different sets, the first being the decrepit ballroom which had been adrift for forty years. The second set was the luxurious ballroom, used in the opening scene with happy party guests having a grand time. "We were filming on a derelict set and a new set, and we shot 80 layers of that scene on a circular motion control track, each time with different things going on. Some we shot forwards, some backwards, some fast, some slow."

Soundtrack

The soundtrack album for Ghost Ship was released on November 5, 2002 on Varèse Sarabande. The songs "Not Falling" by Mudvayne and "Senza Fine" sung by Monica Mancini are not part of the soundtrack despite being featured in the film.

The score is described by Filmtracks.com as "tap [dancing] around some old genre cliches while diving head first into others, producing a score with drama, fright, and a slight hint of elegance at times as well."

ReleaseGhost Ship was theatrically released on October 25, 2002. The theatrical poster for Ghost Ship is similar to that of the 1980 film Death Ship.

Promotion
Warner Bros. in association with Hollywood.com sponsored a sweepstakes to promote the film beginning October 18, 2002, with the final drawing on November 1. Applicants could enter for the chance to win the grand prize dubbed the "Ghost Ship Prize Package" of promotional merchandise consisting of one Ghost Ship baseball hat, one spinning skull mug, one Ghost Ship shower CD player, and the Ghost Ship soundtrack. The runners up would receive just the baseball hat and mug.

Home media
On March 28, 2003, Warner Home Video (currently known as Warner Bros. Home Entertainment) released the film to VHS and DVD. On October 26, 2018, Official Charts Company revealed Ghost Ship was the United Kingdom's 26th best-selling horror DVD/Blu-ray of all time.

A collectors edition of Ghost Ship was produced by Shout! Factory and released on Blu-ray September 29, 2020. It featured a new interview with actor Isaiah Washington, and a new Audio commentary by director Steve Beck.

Reception
Box office
With a reported budget of $20 million, the film opened at no. 3 at the box office with $11,503,423 in ticket sales as Jackass: The Movie dominated the cinema releases. The film grossed $30,113,491 in North America and had an international gross of $38,236,393, earning a total of $68,349,884.

Critical response 
According to internet review aggregator Rotten Tomatoes, Ghost Ship has an approval rating of 15% based on 128 reviews, with an average rating of 3.8/10. The site's critical consensus reads: "With a plot as creaky as the boat, Ghost Ship fails to deliver the scares."  Metacritic gives the film a weighted average score of 28 out of 100 based on 25 critics, indicating "generally unfavorable reviews". Audiences polled by CinemaScore gave the film an average grade of "C+" on an A+ to F scale.

The film received varied critical reception in the United States: The New York Timess Stephen Holden criticized its preoccupation with special effects, and while praising its establishment of mood, ultimately deemed it "an incoherent supernatural thriller that would like to think of itself as a Halloween-ready horror fusion of The Perfect Storm and Titanic." Carla Meyer of the San Francisco Chronicle praised the performance of Isaiah Washington, but deemed the film "a stupid, derivative horror film that substitutes extreme gore for suspense. Granted, there are only so many ways to kill people in these pictures, but lingering on a woman on a meat hook doesn't make a movie scary. It makes it gross."

Manohla Dargis of the Los Angeles Times was critical of the script's lack of character development, writing: "With its minor shivers and modest Grand Guignol showmanship, Ghost Ship is the sort of flimflam that would have filled eight paneled pages in the great horror comic book Tales From the Crypt or consumed about 30 minutes on the latter-day HBO spinoff." Roger Ebert said the film is "better than you expect but not as good as you hope," while Joel Siegel of Good Morning America awarded the film a B− rating, writing: "After a very brutal and bloody beginning, Ghost Ship plays like an old-fashioned ghost story, the kind that kept you awake when you were a kid." In a review published by IGN, the reviewer awarded the film one-and-a-half out of five stars, stating: "as a horror fan, I applaud what Silver and Zemeckis are trying to do with Dark Castle, Ghost Ship just isn't a cruise worth taking."

Upon the film's release in the United Kingdom in January 2003, The Guardians Peter Bradshaw praised its set design, but added "it's the same old tired stuff we've seen a hundred times before in various permutations." Jamie Russell of the BBC awarded the film two out of five stars, but praised its opening sequence.

While critical response to Ghost Ship was varied upon its theatrical release, many contemporary critics and film fans alike praised its elaborate opening murder sequence. Website Bloody Disgusting listed Ghost Ships opening massacre as #13 in their list of "The Top 13 Kills in Horror Movie History," while ComingSoon'' named the scene one of the greatest opening sequences in horror film history.

Accolades

See also
 List of ghost films

References

External links

 
 
 
 
 
 
 Screenplay of Ghost Ship at imsdb.com/scripts

2000s American films
2000s English-language films
2002 films
2002 horror films
American ghost films
American supernatural horror films
Dark Castle Entertainment films
Films produced by Gilbert Adler
Films produced by Joel Silver
Films produced by Robert Zemeckis
Films scored by John Frizzell (composer)
Films set in 1962
Films set in 2002
Films set in the 1960s
Films set on ships
Films shot at Village Roadshow Studios
Films shot in Vancouver
Poisoning in film
Seafaring films
Village Roadshow Pictures films
Warner Bros. films